Leerdam is a Dutch surname. Notable people with the surname include:

Ilja van Leerdam (born 1978), Dutch footballer
Jesper Leerdam (born 1987), Dutch footballer
John Leerdam (born 1961), Dutch politician
Jutta Leerdam (born 1998), Dutch speed skater
Kelvin Leerdam (born 1990), Surinamese footballer

Dutch-language surnames